Limonium sinense is a species of flowering plant in the sea lavender genus Limonium, family Plumbaginaceae, native to coastal China, Taiwan, the Ryukyu Islands, and Vietnam. It is a perennial reaching , found on sandy, salty shales next to the ocean. There are a large number of cultivars, with a wide variety of flower colors, created for the cut flower industry. Wild individuals have flowers with white sepals and yellow petals.

References

sinense
Halophytes
Garden plants
Flora of Manchuria
Flora of North-Central China
Flora of Southeast China
Flora of Taiwan
Flora of the Ryukyu Islands
Flora of Vietnam
Plants described in 1891